Byszewo is a village in Kuyavian-Pomeranian Voivodeship, Poland in the Gmina Piotrków Kujawski, Radziejów County.

History 
Between 1975 and 1998, the village was located in the Włocławek Voivodeship.

References 

Villages in Radziejów County